Francis Scott may refer to:
 Francis Scott, 2nd Earl of Buccleuch (1626–1651), Scottish nobleman
 Francis Scott, 2nd Duke of Buccleuch (1694–1751), Scottish nobleman
 Francis Scott, Earl of Dalkeith (1721–1750), Scottish nobleman
 F. R. Scott (1899–1985), Canadian poet, constitutional expert and intellectual
 Francis Scott (British politician) (1806–1884), British politician
 Francis George Scott (1880–1958), Scottish composer
 Francis Cunningham Scott (1834–1902), British Army officer
 Sir Francis Scott, 3rd Baronet (1824–1863), English landowner

See also
 Frank Scott (disambiguation)